The Lancia Musa (Type 350) is a five-passenger compact MPV manufactured by Fiat, and marketed by the company's Lancia subdivision for model years 2004 through to 2012. A front-engine, front-wheel-drive, five-door design and a modified variant of the Fiat Idea, the Musa also employs the Project 188 platform, originally used for the second generation Fiat Punto.

Background 
The Musa design, an adaption of the Fiat Idea by Fabrizio Giugiaro, was initially supervised by Flavio Manzoni and subsequently Marco Tencone. It debuted at the 2004 Geneva Motor Show and deliveries began in Europe in October of the same year. The Musa's front and rear-end styling bears resemblance to the technically related Lancia Ypsilon, with which it shares headlights. A compact MPV (multi-purpose vehicle), the Musa is considered to form part of the B-segment of the European car market.

The interior features Alcantara or leather, as well as chrome details. Like the Fiat Idea, the Musa offers an automated manual transmission marketed as Dolce Far Niente (D.F.N.) — for all engines except the eight valve version of the 1.4 FIRE.

Facelift 
A revised, mildly facelifted Musa premiered at the 2007 Venice Film Festival, and debuted at Frankfurt Auto Show in October 2007, with a revised logo of Lancia, front bumper fascia with new chrome moldings, bodyside moldings with chrome inserts, LED rear lamps and a luggage compartment seventy litres larger, while and loading deck lowered by 4cm, as well as revised headliner soundproofing in the headliner. 

Options including FCA's integrated In Vehicle Infotainment system (marketed as Blue&Me), new body colours and equipment. In 2008, for the market in Italy, Lancia introduced the EcoChic version with 1.4 Fire 8v dual power (LPG and petrol) engine.

Engines

References

External links

 Official site
 Lancisti.net - An Information Exchange and Support Community for Lancia Owners and Enthusiasts

Musa
Mini MPVs
Compact MPVs
Front-wheel-drive vehicles
2010s cars
 Cars introduced in 2004

fr:Fiat Idea#Lancia Musa